Vatnafjöll is a  long,  wide basaltic fissure vent system that is located southeast of Hekla, Iceland. It is part of the same system as Hekla. More than two dozen eruptions have occurred at Vatnafjöll during the Holocene Epoch. Vatnafjöll last erupted about 1200 years ago.

See also
 List of volcanoes in Iceland
 Volcanism of Iceland

References

Active volcanoes
East Volcanic Zone of Iceland
Fissure vents
Hekla
Volcanoes of Iceland